Shahid Mahallati Metro Station  is one of the stations of Line 3 of Tehran Metro, located at Artesh Expressway in Northeastern Tehran.

References

Tehran Metro stations
Railway stations opened in 2015
2017 establishments in Iran